Clarks Landing, New Jersey may refer to:
Clarks Landing, Atlantic County, New Jersey
Clarks Landing, Ocean County, New Jersey